This page provides lists of best-selling comic book series to date. It includes Japanese manga, American comic books, and European comics.
This list includes comic books that have sold at least 100million copies.

There are three separate lists, for three different comic book publication formats: collected comic book volumes, periodical single-issue floppy comics, and comic magazines. They are separated because the sales figures of these publication formats are not directly comparable.

Collected comic book volumes 
This list is for comics printed in a traditional book format (paperback or hardcover), typically with a similar number of pages as novels. The list includes graphic novels printed exclusively in this format, and trade paperback/hardcover books which compile periodical comic chapters/issues into larger collected volumes. Japanese manga tankōbon volumes and European comic albums account for the vast majority of collected comic book volume sales. American trade paperbacks and graphic novels are also included in the list.

These comic series were originally serialized either as chapters (typically 15-30 pages each) in comic publications (such as comic magazines) or as single-page comic strips in non-comic publications (such as newspapers), before being collected into a larger comic book volume (which compiles either multiple comic chapters or numerous comic strips). For comic series originally serialized as chapters in comic magazines or manga magazines, their estimated circulation figures in those magazines are given in footnotes.

{| class="wikitable sortable"
|- "
!Comic series !! Creator(s) !! Publisher !! No. of collectedvolumes !! Serialized !! Approximate sales
|-style="background: #DFFFDF;"
|One Piece || Eiichiro Oda || Shueisha || 104 || Weekly Shōnen Jump1997 – present ||  
|-style="background: #DFFFDF;"
|Asterix || René GoscinnyAlbert Uderzo || Dargaud  Les Éditions Albert René || 39 || 1959 – present|| 385million
|-
|Peanuts || Charles M. Schulz ||  ||  || 1950 – 2000 || 300million
|- style="background: #DFFFDF;"
|Golgo 13||Takao Saito||Shogakukan|| 203 ||Big Comic1968 – present || 300 million
|- style="background: #DFFFDF;"
|Lucky Luke || Morris || Dupuis  Dargaud  Lucky Comics || 82 || 1946 – present || 300million
|-
|Doraemon || Fujiko Fujio || Shogakukan || 45 || 1969 – 1996 || 300 million
|-
|Dragon & Tiger Heroes (Oriental Heroes)
|Wong Yuk-Long, Tony
|Culturecom
|2427
|1969–present
|280 million
|-
|Dragon Ball || Akira Toriyama || Shueisha || 42 || Weekly Shōnen Jump1984–1995 || 260 million
|-
|The Adventures of Tintin || Hergé || CastermanLe LombardEgmont Group || 24 || 1929 – 1976 || 250million
|-
|Naruto || Masashi Kishimoto || Shueisha || 72 || Weekly Shōnen Jump1999 – 2014|| 250million
|-style="background: #DFFFDF;"
|Case Closed || Gosho Aoyama || Shogakukan || 100 || Weekly Shōnen Sunday1994 – present || 250million{{efn|In addition to tankōbon volume sales, Case Closed / Detective Conan chapters have had a total estimated circulation of approximately 1.3billion copies in Weekly Shōnen Sunday magazine, which has been serializing Detective Conan since January 1994.{{efn|See {{Section link|Weekly Shōnen Sunday|Circulation}}}}}}
|-
|Spike and Suzy || Willy Vandersteen || Standaard Uitgeverij || 365 || 1945 – present || 230million
|-
|Black Jack|| Osamu Tezuka|| Akita Shoten || 25 || 1973–1983 || 176 million
|-
|Slam Dunk || Takehiko Inoue || Shueisha || 31 || Weekly Shōnen Jump1990 – 1996 || 170 million
|-
|KochiKame: Tokyo Beat Cops || Osamu Akimoto || Shueisha || 200 || Weekly Shōnen Jump1976 – 2016|| 156.5million
|-
|Demon Slayer: Kimetsu no Yaiba|Koyoharu Gotōge
|Shueisha
|23
|Weekly Shōnen Jump2016–2020
|150 million
|-style="background: #DFFFDF;"
|Diabolik || Angela GiussaniLuciana Giussani || Astorina || 862 || 1962 – present || 150million
|-style="background: #DFFFDF;"
|Crayon Shin-chan || Yoshito Usui || Futabasha || 67 || 1990–present|| 148 million
|-style="background: #DFFFDF;"
|Garfield || Jim Davis ||  ||  || 1978 – present || 135 million
|-
|Oishinbo || Tetsu Kariya  Akira Hanasaki || Shogakukan || 111 || Big Comic Spirits1983 – present || 135 million
|-
|Bleach || Tite Kubo || Shueisha || 74 || Weekly Shōnen Jump2001–2016 || 120 million
|-style="background: #DFFFDF;"
|JoJo's Bizarre Adventure || Hirohiko Araki || Shueisha || 131 || 1987–present || 120 million
|-style="background: #DFFFDF;"
|-
|Attack on Titan || Hajime Isayama || Kodansha || 34 || Bessatsu Shōnen Magazine 2009 – 2021 || 110 million
|-
|-style="background: #DFFFDF;"
|Amar Chitra Katha || || Amar Chitra Katha Pvt. Ltd. || 449 || 1967 – present || 100 million
|-
|Astro Boy || Osamu Tezuka || Kobunsha || 23 || Shōnen1952 – 1968 || 100 million
|-style="background: #DFFFDF;"
|Casper the Friendly Ghost || Seymour Reit and Joe Oriolo || Harvey Comics ||  || 1949 – present || 100 million
|-
|Fist of the North Star || Buronson and Tetsuo Hara || Shueisha || 27 || Weekly Shōnen Jump1983 – 1988 || 100 million
|- style="background: #DFFFDF;"
|The Kindaichi Case Files || Yōzaburō Kanari, Seimaru Amagi, Fumiya Satō || Kodansha || 86 || 1992–present || 100 million
|-
|Touch || Mitsuru Adachi || Shogakukan || 26 || Weekly Shōnen Sunday1981 – 1986 || 100 million

|}

 Periodical single-issue floppy comics 
This list is for single-issue floppy comics, also known as the American comic book format. Unlike the paperback book format, floppy comics are thinner periodicals and stapled together. Each floppy comic issue is typically 20–40 pages, and usually consists of a single chapter (as opposed to a larger comic book volume that typically includes multiple chapters). A floppy comic is comparable to a comic magazine, but is thinner in size and is dedicated to a single character or group of characters (whereas a comic magazine is thicker and serializes multiple different unrelated series).

Single-issue floppy comics are the most common publication format for American comics, and account for the vast majority of American superhero comic sales. This list also contains periodical publications from other countries that are similarly dedicated to a single character or group of characters. Some of the numbers reported here may also include sales of trade paperback volumes, which account for a small portion of American comic sales.

According to the most recently available data, the best-selling American single-issue comic of all time was X-Men'' #1, which was published in 1991 and has since sold almost 8.2 million copies.

Comic magazines 

This list is for comic magazines, which are anthology magazines that serialize multiple different unrelated comic series. This list includes Japanese manga magazines, European comic magazines, and English-language comic magazines.

In Japan, manga magazines account for the vast majority of manga sales. Most manga series first appear in manga magazines, before later being sold separately as collected tankobon volumes.

See also

List of best-selling manga
List of Japanese manga magazines by circulation
Weekly Shōnen Jump circulation figures
List of best-selling books
List of best-selling fiction authors
List of highest-grossing media franchises

Notes

References

External links
 The Comics Chronicles

Lists of comic series
Literature records
Lists of bestsellers